Sérgio Agostinho de Oliveira Vieira (born 15 January 1983) is a Portuguese football manager, who manages Liga Portugal 2 club C.F. Estrela da Amadora.

Career

Early career
Born in Póvoa de Lanhoso, Braga, Vieira was a forward during his playing days. An S.C. Braga youth graduate, he retired at the age of 21 while playing for Amares, and started studying.

Vieira's first managerial experiences were at Sport Lisboa e Cartaxo and Clube Condeixa, in the regional leagues. After being a tactical coach at Naval 1º de Maio, Académica de Coimbra, Braga (two stints) and Sporting CP, he moved to Brazil.

Brazil
Vieira was appointed manager of Atlético Paranaense's under-23 squad on 3 July 2015; he was signed by the club in January. Late in the month, however, he was named at the helm of Guaratinguetá, as both clubs sealed a partnership.

Vieira took charge of Guará with the side seriously threatened with relegation in Série C, but managed to avoid the drop after achieving four wins and one draw in nine matches. On 28 September he returned to Furacão, being appointed interim manager after the dismissal of Milton Mendes; he remained in charge for two matches, achieving one win and one loss.

On 11 November 2015, Vieira was appointed Ferroviária manager, after another partnership with Atlético was established. During his spell at the club he impressed, after drawing with Corinthians and defeating Palmeiras; on 4 April, however, after the club's qualification chances were null and relegation became a serious threat, he was sacked.

On 4 June 2016 Vieira was named América Mineiro manager in Série A, replacing fired Givanildo Oliveira. He was dismissed just 43 days later, having taken eight points of a possible 15.

Vieira returned to São Paulo state to manage São Bernardo in the 2017 Campeonato Paulista. After the team were relegated with eight losses from 12 games, a clause was activated to dismiss him at the end of March.

Return to Portugal
On 31 October 2017, Vieira was appointed at Moreirense for the rest of the Primeira Liga season with the option of two more. Four days later on his domestic debut, the team drew 1–1 at home to Portimonense. He left by mutual consent on 13 February with the club from Moreira de Cónegos still second from bottom.

Vieira was appointed manager of LigaPro club Famalicão on 30 June 2018, replacing Dito at a team under new foreign ownership. He resigned the following 18 March after a run of three games without a win, despite the side from Vila Nova de Famalicão still being in the promotion places.

On 22 May 2019, Vieira was appointed at Farense for the following second-tier campaign. In his first season on the Algarve – curtailed by the COVID-19 pandemic – he guided the team to promotion to the top flight for the first time in 18 years, and was rewarded with a new three-year deal. On 31 January 2021, with Farense last in the league, he left by mutual consent.

Vieira returned to work on 30 June 2022, on a two-year deal at second-tier club C.F. Estrela da Amadora.

References

External links
 
 
 
 

1983 births
Living people
People from Póvoa de Lanhoso
Portuguese footballers
Association football forwards
Portuguese football managers
Portuguese expatriate football managers
Portuguese expatriate sportspeople in Brazil
Expatriate football managers in Brazil
Campeonato Brasileiro Série A managers
Campeonato Brasileiro Série C managers
Club Athletico Paranaense managers
Guaratinguetá Futebol managers
Associação Ferroviária de Esportes managers
América Futebol Clube (MG) managers
São Bernardo Futebol Clube managers
Primeira Liga managers
Liga Portugal 2 managers
Moreirense F.C. managers
F.C. Famalicão managers
S.C. Farense managers
Sportspeople from Braga District